Monett Municipal Airport  is a public-use airport located in Barry County, Missouri, United States. It is five nautical miles (9 km) west of the central business district of the City of Monett, which owns the airport. According to the FAA's National Plan of Integrated Airport Systems for 2009–2013, it was classified as a general aviation airport.

Although most U.S. airports use the same three-letter location identifier for the FAA and IATA, this airport is assigned HFJ by the FAA but has no designation from the IATA.

Facilities and aircraft 
It has one runway designated 18/36 with a concrete surface measuring 5,000 by 75 feet (1,524 x 23 m).

For the 12-month period ending August 31, 2008, the airport had 18,100 aircraft operations, an average of 49 per day: 80% general aviation, 20% air taxi, and <1% military. At that time there were 39 aircraft based at this airport: 74% single-engine, 10% multi-engine and 15% jet.

References

External links 
 Aerial photo as of 10 March 1995 from USGS The National Map
 Monett Municipal Airport (M58) page at Missouri DOT airport directory
 

Airports in Missouri
Buildings and structures in Barry County, Missouri